The eight Ivy League schools compete annually in men's basketball. The following is a list of past conference champions and a list of notable players. At the conclusion of the regular season the team with the best league record is crowned league champion. If two or more teams are tied for first place at the end of the season the league title is shared. Prior to 2017, the league champion received the league's automatic bid to the NCAA Division I men's basketball tournament. In the event of a shared title a playoff would be held to determine the league's automatic bid. Beginning in 2017 a tournament consisting of the top four teams in the standings is held to determine the recipient of the automatic bid to the NCAA tournament. However, the league championship is still based on regular season standings. The Ivy League was the last Division I conference without a tournament following the regular season.

Princeton and Yale were 2023 league co-champions. Yale was the first seed in the league tournament.

Championships by season

Ivy League Champions

Ivy League tournament champions
The Ivy League began a post-season tournament in 2017. The winner receives the league's automatic bid to the NCAA tournament.

NCAA Tournament Bids

Ivy League NBA players 
These players attended one of the eight Ivy League institutions and had professional careers in the National Basketball Association.

 Bill Bradley
 Chris Dudley
 Jeremy Lin
 Miye Oni
 Devin Cannady
 Ira Bowman
 Matt Langel
 Jerome Allen
 Tony Price
 Rudy LaRusso
 Corky Calhoun
 Dave Wohl
 Matt Maloney
 Jim McMillian
 Geoff Petrie
 Armond Hill
 Brian Taylor

References

External links